The Chateswar Temple is a Hindu temple of Odisha, India, which is dedicated to Lord Mahadev.It is one of a patalaphuta Shivalinga Temple and it is located at the Kishinapur village (Near Paga-Gopinathpur) of Salipur in Cuttack district.

Architecture
On the basis of a number of detached sculptures of different faiths like Saivite and Sakta, the original temple can be assigned to the Eastern Ganga dynasty rule during 12th Century AD. A miniature four- armed Vishnu, broken images of Chamunda, Surya and Buddha, Udyotasimha, Nandi, miniature temple and other architectural members. The temple is pancharatha on plan and the bada has multi-segmented horizontal mouldings in elevation. The temple was built by 'Vishnu' a minister under Ganga monarch Ananga Bhima Deva III whose inscription is also found in the temple.

Festivals
Major ones are Dola Purnima, Shivaratri, Kartik Purnima and Margashirsha Purnima. Mondays and Sankranti days one can see a large crowd. It is easily accessed by road from Cuttack via Jagatpur.

References

External links
chateshwar near kishen pur
evolution of kalinga architecture style
chateshwar deva built by eastern gangas
places to visit around cuttack
chateshwar inscription

Hindu temples in Cuttack
12th-century Hindu temples